Mary Sternberg Thomas (February 25, 1866 – December 26, 1951) was one of Colorado’s first two female lawyers.

She was born on February 25, 1866, in Mason City, Iowa, to Jay and Sarah Ellis Sternberg. The family eventually relocated to Colorado whereupon her father set up the Boulder City Flouring Mill. She received her higher education at the University of Colorado, and by 1887, married William J. Thomas (who worked for the First Judicial District at the time of their marriage).

Thomas eventually became an autodidact of law and received her legal tutelage while working for a judicial officer. She and her husband both passed the oral examinations. While he was admitted, Thomas was denied admission into the State Bar of Colorado due to her sex. Thomas was granted to the ability to practice law only after taking the matter to the Supreme Court of Colorado. By that time, her husband was already working as a judge for Gilpin County. On September 14, 1891, she and Josephine M. Luthe became the first female lawyers in Colorado.  

Thomas died on December 26, 1951, in Denver, Colorado.

See also 

 List of first women lawyers and judges in Colorado

References 

Colorado lawyers
1866 births
1951 deaths
19th-century American women lawyers
19th-century American lawyers